Dhondt is a Dutch surname, most common in East Flanders. It is a compression of the surnames D'Hondt and De Hondt. A variant spelling is Dhont. Notable people with the surname include:

Dhondt
Aaron Dhondt (born 1995), Belgian footballer
Astère M. Dhondt (born 1937), Belgian writer
Philippe Dhondt (born 1965), French singer, songwriter, composer and radio host 
Sean Dhondt (born 1984), Belgian musician 
Dhont
Erik Dhont (born 1962), Belgian landscape architect

See also
 De Hondt
 D'Hondt

References

Dutch-language surnames
Surnames of Belgian origin